Leon Foster (9 June 1913 – 19 April 1991) was a Barbadian cricketer. He played in two first-class matches for the Barbados cricket team in 1931/32 and 1935/36.

See also
 List of Barbadian representative cricketers

References

External links
 

1913 births
1991 deaths
Barbadian cricketers
Barbados cricketers
People from Saint Michael, Barbados